Popular Tales and Romances of the Northern Nations is an anthology of translated German stories in three volumes, published in 1823.

Publication 

The book was announced as being prepared for publication in January and February 1823. All three volumes of the book were published at the same time in July 1823, by Simpkin & Marshall and John Henry Bohte in London. Contemporary adverts state it as being published by J. Anderson Jr. in Edinburgh as well. Several of the stories were reprinted, such as by Anderson in The Common-Place Book of Prose (1825), and Legends of Terror! (1826) with illustrations.

Translators 
The book was published without crediting the original authors of the stories, or their translators. John George Cochrane attributed the translations to "Messrs. Leeds, Browning, De Quincey, and Mrs. Hodgskin". According to Henry George Bohn the translations "are said to be by Gillies, Geo. Soane and De Quincy". George Willis added "Leeds, &c." to this list though Willis and Sotheran catalogues dropped the attribution to Leeds. Sotheran added initials "J. Gillies, G. Soane, and T. de Quincey" but later attributed the book to just W. H. Leeds, as did Bohn. The Brooklyn Public Library also solely attributes it to W. H. Leeds, while the Peabody Institute's Baltimore Library gives "— Leed" as the anonymous editor. Sotheby, Wilkinson & Hodge attributed it to "De Quincey, Gillies and others". De Quincey republished "The Fatal Marksman" in his 1859 collected works, confirming that at least one story was translated by him. In 1825, The Museum of Foreign Literature and Science reported that John Bowring was preparing a translation of Friedrich Laun's  as The Gipsey, A Romance; the following year this notice was published in a number of other magazines, attributed to "the Translator of 'Popular Stories of Northern Nations.

Stories

Reception 
Contemporary reviews were mixed. The Monthly Magazine praised the title page engravings. The Eclectic Review also complimented the title page illustration for volume one, calling it "a fine specimen of both design and execution"; they claimed that they did not have the leisure to analyse the book, but that of the stories, "some of them are good of their kind", singling out "Wake not the Dead" as "an appalling and well-told tale", "The Bottle-Imp", "The Treasure-Seeker" and "The Spectre Barber" as "good specimens of old wives' stories", and stating that "The Collier's Family" "pleases us much". The Literary Chronicle and Weekly Review said the book "will afford an ample treat" to those who can "relax from the severity of graver studies, or who love to recal to memory some of the delights of their childhood", with selections from "Wake not the Dead" ("a dreadful tale of vampyrism") and "Kibitz" ("of a light and amusing character").The Repository of Modern Literature reprinting abridged versions of two of the stories called "The Treasure-Seeker" "one of the best in this amusing collection", and "The Bottle-Imp" "one of the most funny, and, at the same time, most horrible stories in the whole collection". The Common-Place Book of Prose described "The Field of Terror" as an "interesting tale" and "a most amusing work". The Gentleman's Magazine wrote that "from the lively interest which they convey" they "will doubtless long maintain a deserved popularity". In the United States, The Port Folio mentions the book as one of three published around that time that were part of "a great rage at the present in the English reading public for German tales of 'Ghosts and Goblins. Less favourably, John Gibson Lockhart reviewed the book for Blackwood's Magazine, calling it disappointing and saying that it "will do a great deal more harm than good to the popularity of German literature here"; he criticised the selection of stories, "The Sorcerers" and "The Victim of Priestcraft" are given as examples of the "perfect trash" chosen, with most translations said to be "miserable, bald, and even grammarless English" probably caused by "utter laziness and haste", while "The Fatal Marksman", "The Collier's Family", "The Bottle-Imp", and "The Spectre Barber" are said to be among the "few good stories" which are "comparatively speaking, done as they deserved to be". In Germany, Allgemeines Repertorium described the translations as bad, while the Morgenblatt für gebildete Stände expressed disappointment in the poor translations, and the selection of stories chosen. Describing the book in the early twentieth century, Professor Francis Edward Sandbach wrote that it was "of the ghostly romantic type so much in vogue" in the early nineteenth century, with stories "written in a style suggestive of winter evenings and bated breath".

Volume 1's "The Bottle-Imp" was said by literary scholar Joseph Warren Beach to have been a source of inspiration for Robert Louis Stevenson's short story "The Bottle Imp" (1891). Edwin Zeydel writes that the editor of Popular Tales and Romances altered the ending of the tale "to suit himself".

Literary scholar Jan M. Ziolkowski described "Kibitz" as an "adaptation" of Büsching's "" rather than a translation, and modified it when reprinting it in Fairy Tales from Before Fairy Tales (2007).

The book contained the first translation into English for most of these stories, except "The Spectre Barber" and "Kibitz". "The Hoard of the Nibelungen" was the first narrative version of the Nibelungenlied in English. It also contains the first translations into English of any of Ludwig Tieck's works, though the lack of author attribution for any of the stories prevented it from playing an important role in introducing the author to the British public. Zeydel considered the "Auburn Egbert" translation "usually fair", but that it "fails to attain literalness, often produces a false effect and is not infrequently inaccurate", while calling "Elfin-Land" an extremely loose translation that becomes freer and more inexact as it progresses until it can almost be called a rough paraphrase, taking "inexcusable liberties" while "essential touches are omitted" in an arbitrary and unreasoned way. He suggested that a later translation of "" by Julius Hare and James Anthony Froude may have been based on this translation.

References 

1823 anthologies
Fiction anthologies
German short story collections
Translations into English
Works published anonymously